Hans Vintler (died 1419) was a late medieval Tyrolean poet, author of Die Pluemen der Tugent ("The Flowers of Virtue", ed. Zingerle 1874), a didactic poem of 10,172 lines.
He was a member of local nobility, from a family originating in Vintl in the Puster Valley.
He is first recorded in 1407 as joining the Tyrolean defensive pact against Appenzell known as the "Hawks" (Falkenbund). In 1415 he was honored by Sigismund of Luxembourg, who granted him the right to bear a crown on his helmet.

Vintler cannot be considered one of the great poets of his time, but he was reasonably well-read, and had knowledge of both Latin and Italian besides his native German. His main source was the Italian  by Tommaso Gozzadini (c. 1320), besides the Ammaestramenti de’ Filosofi, which were combined with that work in some manuscripts.

References

   
 Zingerle, Ignaz Vincenz, Die pluemen der tugent des Hans Vintler, 1874.

15th-century German poets
15th-century poems
People from Vintl
1419 deaths
Year of birth unknown
German male poets